Iris station is one of the few grade-level stations on the Southwest Ottawa Transitway. It is located on Iris Street, a collector road in western Ottawa.

It is both one of the smallest Transitway stations and one of the least used, likely because it is only 400 m (1/4 mi) south of Queensway station, has no trip generators apart from residential commuters in the area, and does not have any major routes connecting at the station. Only two suburban feeder routes (routes 50 and 58) enter the Transitway at this station.

Iris station is being converted to a light rail station as a part of Stage 2 of the Confederation Line. As a result of this, numerous significant changes and realignments are being made in the vicinity, including the installation of a new bridge on Iris Street and the relocation of the Pinecrest Creek. In June 2022, the segment of Transitway between Iris station and Baseline station closed permanently, with buses currently detoured along Woodroffe Avenue and re-entering the Transitway at this station.

Service

The following routes serve Iris station as of fall 2022:

References

External links
OC Transpo station page
OC Transpo area map

Railway stations scheduled to open in 2025
Transitway (Ottawa) stations